The 2020 Open Quimper Bretagne was a professional tennis tournament played on hard courts. It was the tenth edition of the tournament which was part of the 2020 ATP Challenger Tour. It took place in Quimper, France between 27 January and 2 February 2020.

Singles main-draw entrants

Seeds

1 Rankings as of 20 January 2020.

Other entrants
The following players received wildcards into the singles main draw:
  Dan Added
  Evan Furness
  Kyrian Jacquet
  Jerzy Janowicz
  Valentin Royer

The following players received entry from the qualifying draw:
  Antoine Escoffier
  Lorenzo Musetti

Champions

Singles

 Cem İlkel def.  Maxime Janvier 7–6(8–6), 7–5.

Doubles

 Andrey Golubev /  Aleksandr Nedovyesov def.  Ivan Sabanov /  Matej Sabanov 6–4, 6–2.

References

2020 ATP Challenger Tour
2020
2020 in French tennis
January 2020 sports events in France
February 2020 sports events in France